The anthem of Kamchatka Oblast was the anthem of the former Kamchatka Oblast in Far Eastern Russia, which existed until 1 July 2007. It was adopted in Law of Kamchatka Oblast No. 245 of 29 December 2004, "On the anthem of Kamchatka Oblast". The lyrics were written by Boris Dubrovin, and the music was composed by Evgeniy Morozov.

History 
Work on the anthem began in 2001, when the Heraldic Commission was formed. The Heraldic Commission suggested Russian poet Boris Dubrovin write the lyrics of the anthem, while the music was composed by composer and head of the  Evgeniy Morozov. The anthem was finally signed into law on 29 December 2004 by governor Mikhail Mashkovtsev, nearly eight months after the adoption of the flag and coat of arms on 5 May 2004.

In November 2007, Morozov expressed his intention to submit the same anthem to an upcoming competition for the anthem for the new Kamchatka Krai, which had been formed from the unification of Kamchatka Oblast and Koryak Autonomous Okrug on 1 July 2007, although he stated that the potential for some changes to the lyrics had been discussed, which were eventually implemented in the proposed anthem.

Lyrics

See also 
 Anthem of Kamchatka Krai

References 

Regional songs
Culture of Kamchatka Krai
Kamchatka Oblast
Kamchatka Oblast